The East Germany men's national volleyball team was to 1990 the national team of East Germany. It was governed by the Deutscher Sportverband Volleyball der DDR and took part in international volleyball competitions.

After German reunification became a part of United Germany national team.

Competitive record
 Champions   2nd Place   3rd Place

Summer Olympics

FIVB World Championship

European Championship

Coaches history

See also
 Germany men's national volleyball team

Volleyball
Volleyball in Germany
National men's volleyball teams
Men's sport in Germany